Rim Chang-woo (born 13 February 1992) is a South Korean footballer who plays as centre back .

Career
He was selected by Ulsan Hyundai in the 2010 K-League Draft. He made his K-League debut match against Jeonbuk Hyundai on 17 October 2012. In January 2016 he joined Al-Wahda of the UAE Pro League.

International career
In 2014, he represented South Korea at the 2014 Asian Games and scored the winning goal against North Korea in the final late into extra time.
Rim made his senior debut against China at the 2015 EAFF East Asian Cup.

Honours 

Club

Al Wahda FC
President’s Cup: 2016-17
UAE League Cup: 2015–16, 2017-18
Super Cup: 2017,2018

International

South Korea U23
 Asian Games: 2014
South Korea
 EAFF East Asian Cup: 2015

References

External links 

Rim Chang-woo at Asian Games Incheon 2014

1992 births
Living people
Association football defenders
South Korean footballers
South Korea under-17 international footballers
South Korea under-20 international footballers
South Korea under-23 international footballers
South Korea international footballers
South Korean expatriate footballers
Ulsan Hyundai FC players
Daejeon Hana Citizen FC players
Al Wahda FC players
K League 1 players
K League 2 players
UAE Pro League players
Footballers at the 2014 Asian Games
Asian Games medalists in football
South Korean expatriate sportspeople in the United Arab Emirates
Expatriate footballers in the United Arab Emirates
Asian Games gold medalists for South Korea
Medalists at the 2014 Asian Games
Sportspeople from Jeju Province